Libythea ancoata is a butterfly in the family Nymphalidae. It is found along the north-west coast of Madagascar.

References

Butterflies described in 1891
Libythea
Butterflies of Africa